Lukas John Carey (born 17 July 1997) is a Welsh cricketer who plays for Glamorgan County Cricket Club. Primarily a right-arm fast-medium bowler, he also bats right handed. He made his List A debut for Glamorgan in the 2017 Royal London One-Day Cup on 27 April 2017. He made his Twenty20 debut for Glamorgan in the 2017 NatWest t20 Blast on 30 July 2017.

References

External links
 

1997 births
Living people
Welsh cricketers
Cricketers from Carmarthen
Glamorgan cricketers
Wales National County cricketers